Aillet House is a historic plantation in Port Allen, Louisiana, USA. It was built circa 1830 with bousillage. It belonged to Jean Dorville Landry, a sugar planter prior to the American Civil War of 1861–1865. It has been listed on the National Register of Historic Places since August 9, 1991.

References

Houses on the National Register of Historic Places in Louisiana
Federal architecture in Louisiana
West Baton Rouge Parish, Louisiana
Sugar plantations in Louisiana
National Register of Historic Places in West Baton Rouge Parish, Louisiana

Houses completed in 1830